A phantom limb is the sensation that an amputated or missing limb is still attached. Approximately 80–100% of individuals with an amputation experience sensations in their amputated limb. However, only a small percentage will experience painful phantom limb sensation. These sensations are relatively common in amputees and usually resolve within two to three years without treatment. Research continues to explore the underlying mechanisms of phantom limb pain (PLP) and effective treatment options.

Signs and symptoms

Most (80–100%) amputees experience a phantom limb, with some of them having non-painful sensations. The amputee may feel very strongly that the phantom limb is still part of the body.

People will sometimes feel as if they are gesturing, feel itches, twitch, or even try to pick things up. The missing limb often feels shorter and may feel as if it is in a distorted and painful position. Occasionally, the pain can be made worse by stress, anxiety and weather changes. Exposure to extreme weather conditions, especially below freezing temperatures, can cause increased sensitivity to the sensation. Phantom limb pain is usually intermittent, but can be continuous in some cases. The frequency and intensity of attacks usually declines with time.

Repressed memories in phantom limbs could potentially explain the reason for existing sensations after amputation. Specifically, there have been several reports from patients of painful clenching spasms in the phantom hand with the feeling of their nails digging into their palms. The motor output is amplified due to the missing limb; therefore, the patient may experience the overflow of information as pain. The patient contains repressed memories from previous motor commands of clenching the hand and sensory information from digging their nails into their palm. These memories remain due to previous neural connections in the brain.

Phantom limb syndrome

The term "phantom limb" was coined by physician Silas Weir Mitchell in 1871. For many years, the dominant hypothesis for the cause of phantom limbs was irritation in the peripheral nervous system at the amputation site (neuroma). By the late 1980s, Ronald Melzack had recognized that the peripheral neuroma account could not be correct, because many people born without limbs also experienced phantom limbs. According to Melzack the experience of the body is created by a wide network of interconnecting neural structures, which he called the "neuromatrix".

Pons and colleagues (1991) at the National Institutes of Health (NIH) showed that the primary somatosensory cortex in macaque monkeys undergoes substantial reorganization after the loss of sensory input.

Hearing about these results, Vilayanur S. Ramachandran hypothesized that phantom limb sensations in humans could be due to reorganization in the human brain's somatosensory cortex. Ramachandran and colleagues illustrated this hypothesis by showing that stroking different parts of the face led to perceptions of being touched on different parts of the missing limb. Later brain scans of amputees showed the same kind of cortical reorganization that Pons had observed in monkeys.
 
Maladaptive changes in the cortex may account for some but not all phantom limb pain. Pain researchers such as Tamar Makin (Oxford) and Marshall Devor (Hebrew University, Jerusalem) argue that phantom limb pain is primarily the result of "junk" inputs from the peripheral nervous system.

Despite a great deal of research on the underlying neural mechanisms of phantom limb pain there is still no clear consensus as to its cause. Both the brain and the peripheral nervous system may be involved.

Research continues into more precise mechanisms and explanations.

Neural mechanisms
Pain, temperature, touch, and pressure information are carried to the central nervous system via the anterolateral system (spinothalamic tracts, spinoreticular tract, spinomesencefalic tract), with pain and temperature information transferred via lateral spinothalamic tracts to the primary sensory cortex, located in the postcentral gyrus in the parietal lobe, where sensory information is represented somatotropically, forming the sensory homunculus.

In phantom limb syndrome, there is sensory input indicating pain from a part of the body that is no longer existent. This phenomenon is still not fully understood, but it is hypothesized that it is caused by activation of the somatosensory cortex.

Treatment
Most approaches to treatment over the past two decades have not shown consistent symptom improvement. Treatment approaches have included medication such as antidepressants, spinal cord stimulation, vibration therapy, acupuncture, hypnosis, and biofeedback. Reliable evidence is lacking on whether any treatment is more effective than the others.

Most treatments are not very effective. Ketamine or morphine may be useful around the time of surgery. Morphine may be helpful for longer periods of time. Evidence for gabapentin is mixed. Perineural catheters that provide local anesthetic agents have poor evidence of success when placed after surgery in an effort to prevent phantom limb pain.

One approach that has received public interest is the use of a mirror box. The mirror box provides a reflection of the intact hand or limb that allows the patient to "move" the phantom limb, and to unclench it from potentially painful positions.

Although mirror therapy was introduced by VS Ramachandran in the early 1990s, little research was done on it before 2009, and much of the subsequent research has been of poor quality, according to a 2016 review. A 2018 review, which also criticized the scientific quality of many reports on mirror therapy (MT), found 15 good-quality studies conducted between 2012 and 2017 (out of a pool of 115 publications), and concluded that "MT seems to be effective in relieving PLP, reducing the intensity and duration of daily pain episodes. It is a valid, simple, and inexpensive treatment for PLP."

Other phantom sensations
Phantom sensations may also occur after the removal of body parts other than the limbs, e.g. after amputation of the breast, extraction of a tooth (phantom tooth pain) or removal of an eye (phantom eye syndrome).

Some people who have undergone gender reassignment surgery have reported the sensation of phantom genitals. The reports were less common among post-operative transgender women, but did occur in transgender men. Similarly, subjects who had undergone mastectomy reported experiencing phantom breasts; these reports were substantially less common among post-operative transgender men.

See also
 Neuropathic pain
 Supernumerary phantom limb, where sensations are felt in a limb that never existed
 Synesthesia
 Visual release hallucinations

References

Further reading

External links 

 Phantom limb syndrome: A review M.E.J. ANESTH 19 (2), 2007

Neurological disorders
Syndromes
Amputations
Articles containing video clips
Hallucinations